Caz or CAZ may refer to:

Acronym or abbreviation
 Cazenovia, New York a town in New York state
 Cazenovia (village), New York, a village in the Town of Cazenovia
 CAZ, a Clean Air Zone defined to meet air quality law
 CAZ, IATA code for Cobar Airport
 Conservative Alliance of Zimbabwe, a former political party from Zimbabwe

Name

 Arrow Caz!, a Dutch commercial radio station
 Caz the Rabbit, a character from the Spellsinger series
 24354 Caz, a main-belt minor planet

People
 Camille Cazedessus Jr., American editor and publisher
 Caz the Clash, former guitarist with the band HorrorPops
 Caz Walton, British Paralympic athlete and team manager
 Grandmaster Caz, American DJ and rapper
 Richard Cazeau, co-host of The Adrenaline Project